The enzyme 3-hydroxy-3-isohexenylglutaryl-CoA lyase catalyzes the chemical reaction

3-hydroxy-3-(4-methylpent-3-en-1-yl)glutaryl-CoA  7-methyl-3-oxooct-6-enoyl-CoA + acetate

This enzyme belongs to the family of lyases, specifically the oxo-acid-lyases, which cleave carbon-carbon bonds.  The systematic name of this enzyme class is 3-hydroxy-3-(4-methylpent-3-en-1-yl)glutaryl-CoA acetate-lyase (7-methyl-3-oxooct-6-enoyl-CoA-forming). Other names in common use include beta-hydroxy-beta-isohexenylglutaryl CoA-lyase, hydroxyisohexenylglutaryl-CoA:acetatelyase, 3-hydroxy-3-isohexenylglutaryl coenzyme A lyase, 3-hydroxy-3-isohexenylglutaryl-CoA isopentenylacetoacetyl-CoA-lyase, and 3-hydroxy-3-(4-methylpent-3-en-1-yl)glutaryl-CoA acetate-lyase.

References

 

EC 4.1.3
Enzymes of unknown structure